Boudinot is a given name and surname. People with this name include:

Given name 
Boudinot Currie Atterbury (1852–1930), American doctor and missionary in China

Surname
Elias Boudinot (1740–1821), American revolutionary and President of the Continental Congress
Elias Boudinot (Cherokee) (1802–1839), Cherokee Indian journalist and publisher
Harriet R. Gold Boudinot (1805–1836), wife of Elias Boudinot the journalist
Elias Cornelius Boudinot (1835–1890), Confederate Colonel and Congressman from Arkansas
Ryan Boudinot, 21st century American writer

See also